Paracles plectoides is a moth of the subfamily Arctiinae first described by Peter Maassen in 1890. It is found in Colombia.

References

Moths described in 1890
Paracles